The Megalopsidiinae are a monogeneric subfamily of the Staphylinidae, which includes only the genus Megalopinus. They have large eyes, antennae with distinct di- or trisegmented clubs. The tarsal formula is 5-5-5. They have unique elongated processes at the anterior margin of the labrum. They are found in decaying trees and fungus-infested logs. Three species are found in North America: Megalopinus caelatus (Gravenhorst, 1802), Megalopinus punctatus (Erichson, 1840) and Megalopinus rufipes (LeConte, 1863).

So far, 332 species are known from the entire New World. From the Orientalis 74 (+ one fossil, Megalopinus extinctus Yamamoto & Solodovnikov, 2016, described from Burmese amber) species are known.

References

External links

Megalopsidiinae at Bugguide.net. 

Staphylinidae
Beetles described in 1920
Beetles of North America
Beetle subfamilies